The Statute Law (Repeals) Act 1995 (c 44) is an Act of the Parliament of the United Kingdom.

It implemented recommendations contained in the fifteenth report on statute law revision, by the Law Commission and the Scottish Law Commission.

Schedule 2 - Consequential and connected provisions
Paragraph 1(a), and the words "Great Britain and" in paragraph 1(c), were repealed, on 21 July 2008, by section 1(1) of, and Part 3 of Schedule 1 to, the Statute Law (Repeals) Act 2008.

See also
Statute Law (Repeals) Act

References
Halsbury's Statutes. Fourth Edition. 2008 Reissue. Volume 41. Page 1007.

External links
The Statute Law (Repeals) Act 1995, as amended, from the National Archives.
The Statute Law (Repeals) Act 1995, as originally enacted, from the National Archives.

United Kingdom Acts of Parliament 1995